Events from the year 1261 in Ireland.

Incumbent
Lord: Henry III

Events

Battle of Callann: John fitz Thomas of Desmond and his heir are defeated and killed by Finghin MacCarthy, himself slain later that year.
 Cormac MacCarthy becomes King of Desmond

Births

Deaths
 John FitzThomas FitzGerald, 1st Baron Desmond

References

 
1260s in Ireland
Ireland
Years of the 13th century in Ireland